Mount Luxmore is a mountain in the South Island of New Zealand visible from the nearby town of Te Anau.

The mountain was named by James McKerrow after Philip Bouverie Luxmoore of Timaru.

See also
 List of mountains of New Zealand by height

References

Mountains of Fiordland
Southern Alps